Jovan Mituljikić (born 20 January 2003) is a Serbian football attacking midfielder who plays for Mladost Novi Sad on loan from Red Star Belgrade.

Personal life
Jovan's twin brother Nikola is also a professional footballer.

References

External links
 

2003 births
Living people
Association football midfielders
Serbian footballers
Serbian First League players
RFK Grafičar Beograd players
People from Negotin
Serbian twins
Twin sportspeople
Serbia youth international footballers
Serbia under-21 international footballers